Ian Chen (born September 7, 2006) is a American actor, best known for his work in the TV series Fresh Off the Boat (2015–2020), and movies Shazam! (2019) & Shazam! Fury of the Gods (2023).

Personal life
Ian Chen was born to Taiwanese immigrants in Los Angeles, California. He has a younger brother named Max and both are fluent in Mandarin. He has shown enthusiasm for video games. Chen also sings and plays guitar in a band, and is an aviation enthusiast.

Filmography

Television

Film

Awards and nominations

Chen was ranked #3 in Entertainment Weeklys "12 Under 12: The Best Child Actors of 2015", behind Jacob Tremblay and Marsai Martin.

Chen was named one of Hollywood's Top 30 Stars Under Age 18 by The Hollywood Reporter in 2018  and 2019.

Appearances
In November 2016, Chen opened the "FASO Goes Pops!" orchestra concert with a performance of the young Michael Jackson hit, "Ben."

In June 2016, he starred as the main character in Eric Nam's music video "Into You".

References

External links
 
 
 
 

2006 births
American male television actors
American male actors of Chinese descent
Living people
Male actors from Los Angeles
American male child actors
American people of Taiwanese descent